Lucia Toader ( Sauca; 30 September 1960 – December 2013) was a Romanian rower. She won an Olympic silver medal in the women's eight in 1984 and world titles in the coxed four boat class in 1986 and in the eight in 1987. She competed at the 1986 World Rowing Championships under her married name.

References

External links
 

1960 births
2013 deaths
Romanian female rowers
Rowers at the 1984 Summer Olympics
Olympic silver medalists for Romania
Olympic rowers of Romania
Olympic medalists in rowing
Medalists at the 1984 Summer Olympics
World Rowing Championships medalists for Romania
People from Vaslui County